The 2018 Bexley Council election took place on 3 May 2018 to elect members of Bexley Council in England. This was on the same day as other local elections.

There were boundary changes which reduced the number of wards from 21 to 17 and the number of councillors from 63 to 45.

Overall results
The Conservatives retained control of the council, winning 34 of the new seats. Labour won 11 and UKIP won no seats.

|}

†Notional changes calculated by the BBC.

Ward Results

Barnehurst

Barnehurst became a 2 member ward in 2018, following the cutdown on councilors from 63 to 45. Brian Bishop became Mayor of Bexley after this election.

Belvedere

Leader of the Opposition in Bexley, Daniel Francis, stood here.

Bexleyheath

Blackfen & Lamorbey

Blendon & Penhill

Crayford

Crook Log

Leader of the Council, Teresa O'Neill, stood here, following the abolition of her previous ward; Brampton

East Wickham

Erith

Erith became a 2 member ward, following the cutdown of councillors from 63 to 45.

Falconwood & Welling

Longlands

Longlands became a 2 member ward after the cutdown of councillors from 63 to 45

Northumberland Heath

Northumberland Heath became a 2 member ward in 2018, after the cutdown of councillors from 63 to 45.

Sidcup

Slade Green & Northend

St Mary's & St James

Thamesmead East

Former Labour councillor, Endy Ezenwata, defected to the Christian Peoples Alliance and subsequently lost re-election. Former councillor for Lesnes Abbey, Danny Hackett, stood here following the abolition of his former ward.

On 23 February 2019, Danny Hackett resigned from the Labour Party, citing a culture of "anti-Semitism, hatred and bullying." He will now sit as an Independent.

West Heath

Mayor of the time, Peter Reader, stood here. John Davey became deputy mayor after the election.

2018-2022 by-elections

Longlands

References

2018
2018 London Borough council elections